Simon Nicholas Marquez Enciso (born February 12, 1991) is a Filipino-American professional basketball player for the San Miguel Beermen of the Philippine Basketball Association (PBA).

Amateur career

High school career
Enciso attended at Terra Nova High School in California, where he suited up for the Terra Nova HS Tigers.  In his senior year in 2008–09, he averaged 18.6 points, 2.9 rebounds, 3.5 assists and 2.5 steals per game.

College career
Enciso played two seasons of basketball at Skyline College, and then he transferred to Notre Dame de Namur University in 2012. In his junior year at NDNU, he posted per game averages of 7.3 points, 1.9 rebounds, 1.8 assists, 31.5% 3PT FG percentage in 22 games he played (he averaged 24.3 minutes per game). His senior year saw an increase in his minutes and production, averaging 13.9 points, 4.15 assists, 40.5% FG percentage, 37.4% 3PT FG percentage and 35.1 minutes per game in 26 games (started 25 of them).

PBA D-League

Enciso applied for the 2014 NBA draft but was not drafted by any team.  He decided to move to the Philippines and applied for the 2014 PBA D-League draft, where he was drafted in the third round by the Cebuana Lhuillier Gems.

Professional career
Enciso was drafted in the second round by the Rain or Shine Elasto Painters with the 17th overall pick in the 2015 PBA draft. He was then traded to NLEX Road Warriors in exchange for a 2018 second round pick.

In his PBA debut for the Road Warriors, he registered 15 points (from five three-pointers), three assists and three rebounds in 28 minutes.

On May 10, 2016, Enciso, along with Mark Borboran and a 2018 second round pick, was traded to the Phoenix Fuel Masters for Mac Baracael and Emman Monfort.

On February 18, 2017, he was traded to the Alaska Aces in exchange for fellow guard RJ Jazul. On August 26, 2018, he registered a career-high 30 points and 9 three-pointers made in a 121–95 blowout win over the TNT Katropa. 

On January 6, 2020, he was traded to the TNT KaTropa for Michael DiGregorio and a 2023 second-round draft pick.

On March 11, 2021, Enciso was traded to the Blackwater Bossing in a three-team trade involving Blackwater, TNT, and NLEX Road Warriors.

On September 28, 2021, he was traded to the Terrafirma Dyip for Rashawn McCarthy. On November 13, 2021, before appearing in a game for Terrafirma, he was traded to the San Miguel Beermen for Alex Cabagnot.

PBA career statistics

As of the end of 2021 season

Season-by-season averages

|-
| align=left rowspan=2| 
| align=left | NLEX
| rowspan=2|37 || rowspan=2|24.6 || rowspan=2|.369 || rowspan=2|.351 || rowspan=2|.727 || rowspan=2|1.7 || rowspan=2|2.8 || rowspan=2|.2 || rowspan=2|.1 || rowspan=2|7.3
|-
| align=left | Phoenix
|-
| align=left rowspan=2| 
| align=left | Phoenix
| rowspan=2|36 || rowspan=2|26.9 || rowspan=2|.329 || rowspan=2|.271 || rowspan=2|.429 || rowspan=2|2.0 || rowspan=2|3.6 || rowspan=2|.8 || rowspan=2|.0 || rowspan=2|8.4
|-
| align=left | Alaska
|-
| align=left | 
| align=left | Alaska
| 50 || 26.9 || .390 || .336 || .744 || 1.9 || 3.6 || .5 || .1 || 8.9
|-
| align=left | 
| align=left | Alaska
| 36 || 30.3 || .373 || .333 || .636 || 2.6 || 3.8 || .8 || .1 || 10.2
|-
| align=left | 
| align=left | TNT
| 22 || 31.7 || .345 || .319 || .533 || 2.3 || 2.8 || .7 || .1 || 9.6
|-
| align=left rowspan=2|
| align=left | Blackwater
| rowspan=2|19 || rowspan=2|27.0 || rowspan=2|.376 || rowspan=2|.301 || rowspan=2|.556 || rowspan=2|2.3 || rowspan=2|2.9 || rowspan=2|.3 || rowspan=2|.0 || rowspan=2|9.3
|-
| align=left | San Miguel
|-
|-class=sortbottom
| align="center" colspan=2 | Career
| 200 || 27.6 || .365 || .319 || .623 || 2.1 || 3.3 || .6 || .1 || 8.9

Personal life
Born  in San Francisco, California to Filipino parents, Enciso has dreamed of playing professional basketball in any country but had to fulfill his mother and father's wish for him to get a degree before pursuing a career in the sport. He graduated a degree in Kinesiology. He says he patterned his game after NBA stars Derrick Rose and Kyrie Irving.

References

1991 births
Living people
Alaska Aces (PBA) players
American men's basketball players
American sportspeople of Filipino descent
Basketball players from San Francisco
Filipino men's basketball players
Junior college men's basketball players in the United States
NLEX Road Warriors players
Notre Dame de Namur Argonauts men's basketball players
Point guards
Phoenix Super LPG Fuel Masters players
Shooting guards
TNT Tropang Giga players
Rain or Shine Elasto Painters draft picks
Blackwater Bossing players
San Miguel Beermen players
Citizens of the Philippines through descent